Blondine is a 1945 French fantasy film directed by Henri Mahé and starring Georges Marchal, Nicole Maurey and Michèle Philippe. It was produced in 1943 but not released until 1945 following the Liberation.

Cast
 Georges Marchal as Le Prince 'A' / Astara
 Nicole Maurey as 	Blondine
 Michèle Philippe as Brune
 Piéral as 	Monchéri
 Guita Karen as	Kira
 Jean Clarens as 	Yann
 Libero as Le génie des eaux
 Tony Laurent as Le capitaine-fantôme
 René Wilmet as 	Kerikal
 Alfred Baillou as 	Le premier fou
 Franck Maurice as 	Le bourreau

References

Bibliography 
 Bessy, Maurice & Chirat, Raymond. ''Histoire du cinéma français: encyclopédie des films, 1940–1950. Pygmalion, 1986.

External links 
 

1945 films
French fantasy films
1940s fantasy films
1940s French-language films
Gaumont Film Company films
1940s French films